The 1962 Eisenhower Trophy took place 10 to 13 October on the Fuji Golf Course at the Kawana Resort in Itō, Shizuoka, Japan. It was the third World Amateur Team Championship for the Eisenhower Trophy. The tournament was a 72-hole stroke play team event with 23 four-man teams. The best three scores for each round counted towards the team total.

United States retained the Eisenhower Trophy, finishing 8 strokes ahead of the silver medalists, Canada. Great Britain and Ireland finished 12 strokes behind Canada and took the bronze medal for the third successive time while New Zealand finished fourth. Canadian Gary Cowan had the best aggregate for the 72 holes with a level-par 280.

Teams
23 four-man teams contested the event.

Scores

Individual leaders
There was no official recognition for the lowest individual scores.

Sources:

References

External links
World Amateur Team Championships on International Golf Federation website

Eisenhower Trophy
Golf tournaments in Japan
Eisenhower Trophy
Eisenhower Trophy
Eisenhower Trophy